Sleep journal may refer to:
 A sleep diary, a record of an individual's sleeping and waking times
 Sleep, a medical journal covering sleep research